Hun Hunshi Hunshilal (English Title: Love in the Time of Malaria) is a 1992 Indian Gujarati-language musical political satire film directed by Sanjiv Shah.

Plot
In the kingdom of Khojpuri, King Bhadrabhoop II (Mohan Gokhale), is annoyed by mosquitoes (representative of middle and lower class).

In a small village, Doongri, Hunshi is born to a doctor. After growing up, he adopts more respectable moniker, Hunshilal (Dilip Joshi). Hunshilal moves to Khojpuri to work at Queen's Lab, a laboratory which aims to eradicate mosquitoes problem once and for all. At the lab, Hunshilal falls in love with the fellow scientist, Parveen (Renuka Shahane).

Cast
 Dilip Joshi as Hunshilal
 Renuka Shahane as Parveen
 Manoj Joshi
 Mohan Gokhale as King Bhadrabhoop II of Khojpuri
 Arvind Vaidya as King's assistant

Soundtrack
The film had 45 songs. The composer Rajat Dholakia composed them in two days.

References

External links
 

1992 films
Indian comedy films
Indian satirical films
Films shot in Ahmedabad
Indian political satire films
1990s Gujarati-language films